Joseph Klein (born 1962 in Los Angeles, California) is an American composer, conductor,  and educator. He has taught at the University of North Texas College of Music since 1992, where he is currently Distinguished Teaching Professor and Chair of Composition Studies.  

Klein's work has been recognized by the National Endowment for the Arts,  the American Music Center, the American Composers Forum, the Gaudeamus Foundation, Meet the Composer, the International Society for Contemporary Music,  and the American Society of Composers, Authors, and Publishers.  He has collaborated with the International Contemporary Ensemble,  Pittsburgh New Music Ensemble, Lydian Chamber Players, Voices of Change, Orchestra 2001,  and numerous solo artists including vocalist Joan La Barbara, flutist Helen Bledsoe, cellist Madeleine Shapiro, and glass harmonica player Thomas Bloch.

Education 
Klein studied microbiology and music composition at California State Polytechnic University, Pomona,  where he received a B.A. in Music in 1984.  He subsequently studied composition with Robert Erickson and Roger Reynolds at the University of California, San Diego (M.A. in Music Composition, 1986), and with Harvey Sollberger and Claude Baker at Indiana University Jacobs School of Music, where he received a D.Mus. in Composition in 1991, with minors in music theory and art history.

Music  
Klein's creative output comprises solo, chamber, and large ensemble works, including instrumental, vocal, electroacoustic, and intermedia compositions. His music reflects an ongoing interest in processes drawn from sources such as fractal geometry, chaos theory, and systems theory, often inspired by natural phenomena.  Klein frequently incorporates theatrical elements in his work, either as an  extra-musical feature or as an organic extension of the musical narrative.  Recent works, most notably the cycle of nineteen works collectively titled An Unaware Cosmos (2012-2018), explore modular, recombinant, and non-linear formal paradigms. 
 
Literary influences include Franz Kafka, Elias Canetti, Alice Fulton,  W.S. Merwin, Milan Kundera, and Christina Rossetti.  In particular, Canetti's writings Earwitness (Der Ohrenzeuge, 1974) and Crowds and Power (Masse und Macht, 1960) have inspired over twenty solo instrumental and open-form chamber works composed since 1997.
   
Musical influences include Edgard Varèse, György Ligeti, Olivier Messiaen, and Morton Feldman.  He also specializes in the music of Frank Zappa,  and has taught courses, organized performances, given interviews, and presented lectures on Zappa's life and work.

Selected works 
Large ensemble works
 March Transforms — a deconstruction of Sousa's "Stars and Stripes Forever" for wind ensemble (1986; rev. 1993)
 Pathways: Opposing Forces for solo trombone and chamber orchestra (1993)
 Pathways: Revolution for solo percussion and chamber orchestra (1993/95)
 Pathways: Interior Shadows for solo soprano saxophone and chamber orchestra (1993/95) 
 the road in its unfoldings meta-passacaglia for wind symphony (1996-97)
 Zwei Parabeln nach Franz Kafka for narrator, mixed choir, and computer music (2006) 

Chamber music
 IcarUS At thE caBARet VoLtairE: parT I (tHe RENdeZVOus) for two guitarists (1985)
 Parallaxes for four trombones (1988)
 Occam's Razor seven studies for ten players (1994/99)
 Interstices for flute/piccolo, soprano/tenor saxophone, and percussion (2013-14)
 An Unaware Cosmos modular work for multiple soloists and chamber ensembles (2012-18)
 Canetti-menagerie open-form work after Elias Canetti, for 5 to 8 players (2015)
 Recombinant for clarinet, violin, and piano (2019)

Solo works
 Der Leichenschleicher for solo contrabass (1997) 
 Die Tischtuchtolle for solo violin (1997)
 Die Silbenreine for solo glass harmonica (2000)
 Der Ohrenzeuge for solo bass flute (2001)
 Die Königskünderin for solo trumpet (2006)
 Die Sternklare for solo percussion (2006)
 Der Schönheitsmolch for solo bass saxophone (2008)
 Der Hinterbringer for solo piccolo (2013)
 Der Gottprotz for solo organ (2014)
 Die Schadhafte for solo violoncello (2015)
 Der Saus und Braus for solo piano (2017)
 Chain of Circumstances  modular work for solo piano or piano four hands with optional live electronics (2020)

Electronic and intermedia works
 Goblin Market for trombonist, pianist, and intermedia environment (1993)
 Dog (after W.S. Merwin) for female voice, bassoon, and intermedia (1997)
 Leviathan (after W.S. Merwin) for male voice, bass trombone, and intermedia (1998)
 Three Poems from Felt (after Alice Fulton) — poetry reading with computer music (2005)
 Cornell Set — poetry reading with computer music (2011)

Selected discography 
 Pathways: New Music for Trombone, Mark MCD-2645 (1998); Andrew Glendening, trombone.
 CEMISonics: The Threshold of Sound, Centaur CRC-2407, Consortium to Distribute Computer Music, Vol. 27 (1998).
 Equipoise: Music of Joseph Klein and William Kleinsasser, Innova 611 (2005).
 Facets 3: New American Music for Trumpet, Mark MCD-2645 (May 2009); John Holt, trumpet. 
 Music from the University of North Texas Center for Experimental Music and Intermedia, Centaur CRC-3219, Consortium to Distribute Computer Music, Vol. 39 (2012).
 Improbable Encounters: Music of Joseph Klein, Innova 873 (2014).

References

External links 
 Official Joseph Klein webpage
 Joseph Klein at Pytheas Center for Contemporary Music  
 Joseph Klein at Contemporary Composers Index 
 Joseph Klein at International Society for Contemporary Music (ISCM)  
 Joseph Klein at The Pew Center for Arts & Heritage 
 Joseph Klein at Innova Recordings  
 Joseph Klein on YouTube  

1962 births
20th-century American composers
20th-century American conductors (music)
20th-century American male musicians
20th-century classical composers
21st-century American composers
21st-century American conductors (music)
21st-century American male musicians
21st-century classical composers
American classical composers
American contemporary classical composers
American electronic musicians
American male classical composers
American music educators
Classical musicians from California
Contemporary classical music performers
Experimental composers
Indiana University alumni
Living people
Musicians from Los Angeles
People from Los Angeles
Pupils of Claude Baker
Pupils of Harvey Sollberger
Pupils of Robert Erickson
Pupils of Roger Reynolds
University of California, San Diego alumni